Narendra Suri was an Indian bollywood film director in '60s-'70s. He had directed 6 films in hindi and produced a film Badi Didi in 1969. He was an associate director of Shikast hindi film directed by Ramesh Saigal in 1953.

Filmography
 Begunah (1957)
 Lajwanti (1958)
 Majboor (1964)
 Purnima (1965)
 Badi Didi (1969)
 Vandana (1975)

References

External links
 
 Narendra Suri Movies

Hindi-language film directors